is a Japanese UCI Continental cycling team established in 2013. It gained UCI continental status in 2015, and the team was led by 2014 Japanese National Road Race Championships winner Junya Sano.

Team roster

Major results
2022
 1st Stage 2 Tour de Hokkaido, Junsei Tani

References

External links

UCI Continental Teams (Asia)
Cycling teams established in 2013
Cycling teams based in Japan